refers to two Japanese railway lines:
Keikyū Daishi Line in Kawasaki-ku, Kawasaki, Kanagawa Prefecture
Tobu Daishi Line in Adachi, Tokyo